Gratitude (stylized as GRATITUDE) is LISA's second album, her first being Juicy Music, and was released on June 30, 2004. The album charted at #18 during its first week on the Oricon Albums Charts, with 11,049 copies sold.

Background information
Gratitude is Japanese R&B/reggae singer LISA's second studio album since she left the hip-hop duo m-flo. The album was released in June 2004 and debuted at #19 on Oricon, staying on the charts for seven weeks. During its run, the album sold 11,049 in its first week and a total of 22,393 by the end of week seven.

The album was released as a CD+Bonus CD edition - the latter of which featured covers of famous songs, both in English and Japanese. Some of the songs included "Lucky Star" by Madonna, "Time After Time" by Cyndi Lauper and "I Only Want to Be with You" by Dusty Springfield.

To help promote the album, some of the songs were used in promotional advertisements. Those songs included "So Beautiful" for Nivea, "I Only Want To Be With You" for an electronics store and "Switch" for the Crimson Tears video game.

The album featured several Japanese artists on various tracks. Japanese salsa band Orquesta de la Luz ("Orchestra of the Light") collaborated with LISA for the track "Gracias a Dios" (lit. Thank God). Reggae band HOME GROWN was featured in two tracks on the album: "Peace in Love" (track #6) and "Tonbo," which was track #3 on the second disc. Eurobeat soloist LISA LION also made an appearance for the song "i am pop."

Promotional advertisements
Some of the album's tracks were used to help promote both shows and products.

"So Beautiful" (track #4) was used in an advertisement for Nivea's Medicated Body Whitening "Stretch Up." (ニベアボディ薬用ホワイトニング・ストレッチアップ / BODI Yakuyou HOWAITONINGU STRETCH UP). "I Only Want To Be With You" was used in a television commercial for TDK Electronics.

The only other track to be used was "Switch," which was used as the theme song to the Japan released Capcom game Crimson Tears for the PlayStation 2.

Track listing

References

External links
LISA Official Discography Web Site 
 Oricon Music Special

2004 albums
LISA (Japanese musician, born 1974) albums
Avex Group albums